Sarcodon aglaosoma is a species of tooth fungus in the family Bankeraceae. Found in Papua New Guinea, it was described as new to science in 1976 by Dutch mycologist Rudolph Arnold Maas Geesteranus. It is quite similar to H. joeides and S. ianthinus, both also from New Guinea.

References

External links

Fungi described in 1976
Fungi of New Guinea
aglaosoma